Warasiguda is one of the neighborhoods in Hyderabad, India. It is named by Waris nawab.

Etymology 
The name Warisguda was derived from two words, Waris and guda. Waris Khan, who got this land as gift from Nizams of Hyderabad has sold it to different people; and guda refers to a populated place. The area comes under Chilkalguda Police Station limits

Education 
Osmania University which is one of the oldest modern universities in India is at a distance of one kilometer from the area.

A few of schools in this area include Kakatiya Techno School, Jyothi Model High School, Sumitra High School, Jawahar English High School and Balaji High School. Johnson Grammar School (ICSE) and Netaji public high school have been the prominent schools of this area.

Culture 

Islamic religious places of worship

The area has many prominent Mosques that include Jamia Masjid Al-Kausar, masjid e firdaus , masjid e sami wo hussain, Masjid-E-Noor-E-Mohammadiya and many more

Hindu religious places of worship

Sri Umachandra mouleshwara swamy Temple near arts college railway station is adobe of lord Shiva and Parvathi devi, lord Ganesha, Sitha Rama, Anjaneya swamy, Shiridi Saibaba.
The famous Sri Subrahmanyaswamy Temple and Hanuman Temple are located one kilometer away from Warisguda.

Transport 
The TSRTC buses connect Warisguda with all parts of the city. 86 Bus route shuttles mainly between Secunderabad and Koti. 107J bus shuttles between Secunderabad and Dilsukhnagar.

The closest MMTS Train station is Arts College Railway Station. MMTS train services are very frequent from this station to commute to Falaknuma, Lingampally, and Hitech City.

References 

Neighbourhoods in Hyderabad, India